() is a Scottish Gaelic phrase used to express allegiance to Scotland (Alba). Idiomatically it translates into English as 'Scotland forever'.

It has also been used on some Scotland Football National team shirts over the past few seasons.

The phrase is parallel to the Irish  ('Ireland Forever'), Welsh language slogan  ('Wales forever'), the Breton  ('Brittany forever') or the Cornish language  ('Cornwall forever').

Popular culture 
In the 1995 film Braveheart, Scottish knight William Wallace (portrayed by Mel Gibson) shouts "Alba gu bràth" as he gallops across the front of his assembled Scottish troops just prior to their decisive victory at the Battle of Stirling Bridge.

References 

British political phrases
Politics of Scotland
Scottish independence
Scottish nationalism